The War Report is the debut studio album by American hip hop duo Capone-N-Noreaga (C-N-N). The album features the singles "L.A., L.A.", "T.O.N.Y.", "Illegal Life" and "Closer". Tragedy Khadafi appears on more than half of the album's songs and served roles as both producer and executive producer. The success of the album managed the group to make a sequel titled The War Report 2: Report the War. The album was originally scheduled to be released on June 15, 2010, almost exactly 13 years to the original, but it was pushed back a month later to July 13, 2010.

Track listing

^Busta Rhymes' part is cut off before he starts. He only appears on the last 20 seconds of the song, ad-libbing over the hook.
The songs "Stick You," "Parole Violators," "Halfway Thugs," and "L.A., L.A (Kuwait Mix)" are partially edited, even though the album was released with an explicit-lyrics sticker.

Sample-clearance issues caused two tracks, "Married to Marijuana" and "Calm Down (Feat. Nas & Tragedy Khadafi)," to be cut from the retail version of the album. Both songs were originally on the promo version sent out for reviews but were omitted from the retail album when it hit stores. Both became popular mixtape and underground radio tracks and were released as white label 12-inch singles.

Samples
"Bloody Money"
"Impeach the President" by the Honey Drippers
"Philadelphia Morning" by Bill Conti
"Capone Bone"
"Step into Our Life" by Roy Ayers
"Cruisin'" by D'Angelo
"L.A., L.A. (Kuwait Mix)"
"The Letter" by Al Green
"New York, New York" by Grandmaster Flash & the Furious Five
"Iraq (See the World)"
"Night Song" by Noel Pointer
"T.O.N.Y (Top of New York)"
"Speak Her Name" by Walter Jackson
"Live On, Live Long"
"Who's Gonna Take the Blame" by Smokey Robinson & The Miracles
"Closer"
"Closer Than Friends" by Surface
"Promise Me" by Luther Vandross
"Channel 10"
"M5 (SK 7)" by Roy Budd
"Stick You"
"Orange Was the Color of Her Dress, Then Silk Blues" by Charles Mingus
"Halfway Thugs"
"A Change Is Gonna Come" by Aretha Franklin
"Only Because of You" by Roger Hodgson
"Black Gangstas"
"Olhos De Gato" by Gary Burton
"Driver's Seat"
"Do the Thing That's Best You" by Willie Hutch
"Stay Tuned"
"Theme from S.W.A.T." by Rhythm Heritage

Album singles
"Illegal Life"
Released: 1996
B-side: "L.A,. L.A."; "Stick You"
"T.O.N.Y. (Top of New York)"
Released: 1996
B-side:
"Closer"
Released: 1997
B-side: Closer (Sam Sneed Version) Produced By Sam Sneed
"Capone Bone"
Released: 1997
B-side: "Calm Down" (featuring Tragedy Khadafi & Nas)

Charts

Weekly charts

Year-end charts

Singles

References

1997 debut albums
Capone-N-Noreaga albums
Tommy Boy Records albums
Albums produced by Clark Kent (producer)
Albums produced by Lord Finesse
Albums produced by Buckwild
Albums produced by Marley Marl